The Balanta (Guinea-Bissau Creole and Portuguese: balanta; ; lit. “those who resist” in Mandinka) are an ethnic group found in Guinea-Bissau, Guinea, Senegal, Cape Verde and The Gambia. They are the largest ethnic group of Guinea-Bissau, representing more than one-quarter of the population. Despite their numbers, they have remained outside the colonial and postcolonial state because of their social organisation. The Balanta can be divided into six clans: Nhacra, Ganja (Mane), Naga, Patch, Sofa and Kentohe. The largest of which are the Balanta Kentohe. 

Archaeologists believe that the people who became the Balanta migrated to present-day Guinea-Bissau in small groups between the 10th and 14th centuries CE. During the 19th century, they spread throughout the area that is now Guinea-Bissau and southern Senegal in order to resist the expansion of the Kaabu kingdom. Today, the Balanta are found in the modern-day countries of Senegal, Cape Verde and Gambia but mostly reside in the southern and central regions of Guinea-Bissau.

Genetics and Origin
According to their oral tradition, the Balanta people originated in Sudan. Linguist Fernando Rogado Quintino found some language similarities between the Balanta and Sudanese peoples, which hinted at a Sudanese origin. Dr. Franz Stuhlmann also theorized that the Balanta descended from a Bantu people who inhabited the Nile and separated during the Pleistocene period. Despite this early research, a Sudanese origin of the Balanta was still heavily criticized in some academic circles. It wasn't until recently that genetic testing and haplogroup assigning revealed that the Sudan origin theory had merit. A collection of blood samples from Balanta people in Guinea-Bissau were studied. Unexpectedly, some of the samples carried the haplogroups M1 and U6, which are haplogroups that are normally observed in North Africa, East Africa and the Middle East. They also found that Balanta haplotype GB44 only matched Sudanese sequences and haplotype GB59 only matched with Moroccan sequences. Scientists currently believe that these findings support a Sudanese origin for the Balanta people through the migration of a Kushitic group to western Africa about 2,000 years ago.

Culture

All important decisions amongst the Balanta are taken by a Council of Elders. To become a member of the Council of Elders, the person has to be initiated during the Fanado ceremony. In general, egalitarianism prevails amongst the Balanta. Consequently, the Portuguese colonialists found it difficult to govern them.  In the late nineteenth and early twentieth centuries, Portugal mounted pacification campaigns against the resistant Balanta and subjected them to appointed Fulbe chiefs. Because of the Portuguese repression, the Balanta enlisted as soldiers in great numbers and were principal supporters of the PAIGC in the nationalist struggle for liberation during the 1960s and 1970s. Many Balanta resented their exclusion from the government; their prominence in the military spurred a series of Balanta-led coup attempts in the 1980s.

Religion

The Balanta practice indigenous, spiritual customs and rites. In the Balanta society, God is believed to be far away, and communication with the Almighty is established  through their spiritual practices and traditions. Although Catholicism has been partially accepted, Islam is strong and practiced along with their unique spirit worship.

Music

The Balanta play a gourd lute instrument called a kusunde. On the kusunde instrument, the short string is at the bottom rather than at the top, the top string was of middle length and the middle string is the longest although it was capoed by the middle length string and its open sounding length is therefore the same as that string. The tones produced by the instrument are in all: top string open F#, top string stopped G#, middle string open C#, middle string stopped D#, bottom drone string A#/B. The Balanta kusunde is similar to the Jola akonting. The Balanta also play the balafon, which is composed of 24 layers instead of 12 or 14 found in the Mandingue community.

Marriage

In People Like Me 2002: Face to Face!, the Sunugal Ballet presented the Balanta wedding dance from the village of Mini-Ndame.  In this village, when the prince comes of age to marry, the kingdom has a big party, to which every family brings their daughters.  The young women compete with their beauty and their virtuosic dancing for the hand of the prince. The prince then chooses his bride, and a celebration ensues. To prove his courage to his future wife, a Balanta man must steal a cow.  The masks that are used in this dance include a large spirit mask laden with cowry shells, an old woman mask, a young girl mask, and a young man mask.  As symbols of family and spiritual connection, the masks play an important role when the community comes together to celebrate with music and dance.

Farming

The Balanta are fishermen, herders, and cultivators.  They grow millet, rice, peanuts, cashews, and fruit for a cash crop.  Their specialty is the culture of cashew which they derive from the apple wine cashew called Cadjou.  The export to India of cashew nuts also provides an important economic force in the Balanta villages.  Raising cattle is also a traditional activity predominant as the sacrifice of the cattle is import in all stages of life (initiation, marriage, death, etc.)  The back of Guinea-Bissau's 50-peso note (No. 1) shows two farmers wielding an agricultural tool that is called a kebinde in the Balanta language (also called an arade in Guinean Creole).  These tools are used by the Balanta, Jola and Papel peoples to prepare the soil for planting crops – usually rice.  Use of the kebinde is an art that has been perfected over many years by the Balanta people who deservedly hold a reputation as expert farmers.  Along with intricate irrigation systems that mix salt and fresh water, they manage to maintain the nutrients in the soil and achieve excellent yields.  After the harvest, the Balanta people have a celebration called the Kussundé, where non-initiated men compete in dances.

Rites of passage

The Balanta have initiation rites at various states of the individual's life.  Each phase of life, from childhood to adulthood, is regulated by an initiation that marks the entrance into a new social category.  From early childhood up to age 15, the child belongs to the category of Nwatch.  Around age 18 to 20 the individual enters the Fuur and then enters the Nghaye around age 25.  Around age 30, according to the rites of Kgness a man will be authorized to take a woman.

After the young Balanta man has become a landowner and taken on family responsibilities, he can then be chosen by his maternal uncle to participate in the Fanado initiation.  Once chosen for the Fanado, a Balanta man cannot refuse the family's wishes.  The Fanado initiation ceremony takes place once every four years.  The Fanado is a two-month process in the “sacred woods” which is the ultimate phase of initiation rites and social hierarchy.  Initiation during the Fanado ritual opens the doors of maturity and wisdom in the Balanta community.  Depicted on the back of the 50-peso note (No. 1) is a man in the costume worn by young Balanta men during the “Fanado” or male circumcision ceremony.  Part of the costume is a tortoise shell that is hollowed out and worn on the back.

The first day of the Fanado ceremony is a general festival for the entire village during which people eat, drink and dance.  The initiates are presented to the village by their maternal uncles and greeted by the village.  After the presentation and greeting, the initiates are brought in the middle of a tropical forest to a place completely secret called the “sacred woods.”  In the “sacred woods” the initiates are circumcised by the “master”, a sort of magical figure-pedagogical.  After the first few days of circumcision, the initiates must build a kind of hut that will serve as their home-base for the next two months.  During these two months, the initiates only have contact with their uncles and the “master”.  The initiates undergo test of endurance and learn to be men.  What is imparted to the initiates during the Fanado not only concerns their entire culture, but also how to behave with others, how to manage the family, and how to live as adults and men therefore wise.  The tests and trials are hard to the point where some people face physical suffering, mutilation, and/or do not survive.

Once completed, the initiate is a mature man, capable of taking care of other people in the tribe.  After two months in the “sacred woods,” the initiate (if survived) is ready to return to his family as a new man.  Nothing remains of the place where the rite was held, everything is burnt and jealously guarded in secret by those who took part.  Mothers learn of the fate of their children only on arrival to the village of the “new” men.   The most valiant initiates that do survive emerge from the “sacred woods” to songs of their bravery by family and friends.  The initiate then wears a bright red hat to show that he has become Lante Ndang (brave and wise), and the following day he will be allowed to serve on the council of elders who manages village life.  The ex-president of Guinea-Bissau Kumba Yalla is a member of the Balanta people and was often seen wearing a red hat as a sign that he had completed the Fanado initiation.

References

Further reading
•Hawthorne, Walter. Planting Rice and Harvesting Slaves: Transformations along the Guinea-Bissau Coast,1400-1900. Heinemann, 2003.

External links
Balanta language
Balanta dance
Balanta music

Ethnic groups in Guinea-Bissau
Ethnic groups in Senegal
Ethnic groups in the Gambia
Muslim communities in Africa